The ALFA Defender is a Czech-made semi-automatic pistol created for military, law enforcement, and sport shooting purposes. There are two different series of pistols made by ALFA, the Combat series and Defender Series.

See also
List of firearms
ALFA Combat
Series ALFA
Series ALFA steel

References

9mm Parabellum semi-automatic pistols
.40 S&W semi-automatic pistols
.45 ACP semi-automatic pistols
Semi-automatic pistols of Czechoslovakia